William Aubrey (c. 1529 – 25 June 1595) was Regius Professor of Civil Law at the University of Oxford from 1553 to 1559, and was one of the founding Fellows of Jesus College, Oxford. He was also a Member of Parliament for various Welsh and English constituencies between 1554 and 1592.

Early life and Oxford University
Aubrey was born in Brecknockshire, Wales, the second of Thomas Aubrey, MD, of Cantreff.

After being educated at what later became Christ College, Brecon, Aubrey went to Oxford University, becoming a Fellow of All Souls College, Oxford in 1547. He obtained a BCL degree in 1549 and was appointed Principal of New Inn Hall, Oxford in 1550. In 1553 he succeeded Robert Weston as Regius Professor of Civil Law. He held the position until 1559, when he was succeeded by John Griffith. He served as judge-marshal of the army led by William Herbert, the Earl of Pembroke in the St. Quentin campaign of 1557.

In 1571 he was named in the foundation charter as one of the original eight fellows of Jesus College, Oxford. He obtained the degree of DCL in 1554 and the following year he was made a Master in Chancery.

Legal and political work

In 1562 Aubrey was a member of the commission set up by Matthew Parker, Archbishop of Canterbury that declared unlawful the marriage of Lady Catherine Grey to Henry Herbert (son of the 1st Earl of Pembroke). He was one of the signatories of the opinion that John Lesley (Bishop of Ross and an ambassador for Mary, Queen of Scots) could be tried in England for intriguing against Queen Elizabeth.

He was MP for various constituencies: Carmarthen Boroughs (1554), Brecon (1558), Hindon (1559), Arundel (1563), and Taunton (1593). He was a member of the Council of Wales and the Marches from 1586. He was also auditor and vicar-general of the Province of Canterbury under Archbishop Grindal, retaining his position as vicar-general under Archbishop Whitgift.

Death
Aubrey died in London, England in 1595 and was buried in Old St Paul's Cathedral.

References

1520s births
1595 deaths
16th-century English judges
16th-century Welsh writers
English MPs 1554
English MPs 1558
English MPs 1559
English MPs 1563–1567
English MPs 1593
Fellows of All Souls College, Oxford
Fellows of Jesus College, Oxford
Members of the Parliament of England (pre-1707) for constituencies in Wales
People educated at Christ College, Brecon
People from Brecknockshire
Principals of New Inn Hall, Oxford
Regius Professors of Civil Law (University of Oxford)
Welsh educators
Welsh lawyers
16th-century English lawyers
16th-century Welsh politicians